Muslim bin Mohammad bin Yusuf Al-Zajaj (Arabic: مسلم بن محمد بن يوسف الزَجاج), known as Abu al-Waleed, was one of the two leaders of the 1058 Bahraini revolution; the other being his brother Al-Awwam.

References
 http://alwasatnews.com/ipad/news-34999.html

Medieval Bahraini people
11th-century Arabs